Union Line may mean: 
 Union Company, also known as the Union Line and Union Steam Ship Company (USS Co), was started in Dunedin, New Zealand, in 1875.
 Union Line (Colorado River), a rival steamboat company to George A. Johnson & Company on the Colorado River 1864-1865.  
 Union-Castle Line a British steamship line also called the Union Line.